Ecurie Nationale Belge (also known as Equipe Nationale Belge or ENB) was a Formula One and sportscar racing team in the 1950s and 1960s, which was formed through a merger of Jacques Swaters' Ecurie Francorchamps and Johnny Claes' Ecurie Belge.

In Formula One, the team used a variety of different chassis through the years: Ferrari, Cooper, Lotus, Emeryson as well as a car of their own construction, the ENB, which participated in a single World Championship Grand Prix, the 1962 German Grand Prix and was designed by one of the teams co-founder's Jacques Coune.

Complete Formula One World Championship results 
(key)

References

ENB page at ChicaneF1

Formula One constructors
Formula One entrants
Belgian auto racing teams
Auto racing teams established in 1955

24 Hours of Le Mans teams